The tennis competition at the 2018 Central American and Caribbean Games was held in Barranquilla, Colombia from 27 July to 2 August at the Parque Distrital de Raquetas.

Medal summary

Men's events

Women's events

Mixed event

Medal table

Men's singles

Seeds

Draw

Finals

Top half

Bottom half

Women's singles

Seeds

Draw

Finals

Top half

Bottom half

Men's doubles

Seeds
  Christopher Díaz Figueroa / Wilfredo González (final; silver medalists)
  Roberto Cid Subervi / Víctor Estrella Burgos (champions; gold medalists)
  Nicolás Mejía / Eduardo Struvay (semifinals; bronze medalists)

Draw

Women's doubles

Seeds
  Mariana Duque Mariño / Camila Osorio (final; silver medalists)
  Melissa Morales / Kirsten-Andrea Weedon (quarterfinals)

Draw

Mixed doubles

Seeds
  José Olivares / Kelly Williford (final; silver medalists)
  Eduardo Struvay / María Paulina Pérez (champions; gold medalists)

Draw

Men's team

Seeds

Draw

Quarterfinals

Semifinals

Bronze medal match

Gold medal match

Women's team

Seeds

Draw

Quarterfinals

Semifinals

Bronze medal match

Gold medal match

References

External links
2018 Central American and Caribbean Games – Tennis

2018 Central American and Caribbean Games events
Central American and Caribbean Games
2018
Tennis tournaments in Colombia
Qualification tournaments for the 2019 Pan American Games
2018 in Colombian tennis